WOD may refer to:

 Warsash One Design, 27 ft sailing yacht designed by Fred Parker in the 1960s
 Wodonga railway station, in Victoria, Australia
 Wolani language
 Workout of the Day, an integral part of CrossFit
 World Oceans Day, celebrated 8 June
 World of Dance, an American media company
 World of Darkness, fictional settings for supernatural horror-themed role-playing games
 World of Warcraft: Warlords of Draenor, the fifth World of Warcraft expansion set
 William O. Douglas, American jurist